Li Zhongyun (Chinese: 李忠云; born March 4, 1967) is a female Chinese Judoka. She competed at 1992 Barcelona Olympic Games, and won a bronze medal in Women's 52 kg.

She also won a gold medal in the -48 kg division at the 1988 Summer Olympics in Seoul, where women's judo was held as a demonstration sport.

References

External links
 

Olympic bronze medalists for China
Living people
Olympic medalists in judo
Asian Games medalists in judo
1967 births
Judoka at the 1990 Asian Games
Chinese female judoka
Medalists at the 1992 Summer Olympics
Asian Games gold medalists for China
Medalists at the 1990 Asian Games
Judoka at the 1992 Summer Olympics
20th-century Chinese women
21st-century Chinese women